The Songwriter's Network (SongNet) is a volunteer-run organization that supports the networking of songwriters in the Los Angeles, California area. Founded in October 1998, SongNet has sponsored monthly seminars in which a music industry related guest representative discusses their experience in the industry, and also conducts some songwriting critique of recorded works that attendees have brought with them. In addition to the monthly seminar, SongNet has sponsored a monthly singer-songwriter showcase, in which performers can perform 2 of their musical works for the audience.

History 

SongNet is the brainchild of Los Angeles songwriter Linda Geleris. Geleris felt the isolation experienced by many creative people and in response, sought out other songwriters hoping to build careers in the music business. In the back of her "Songwriters Market" book, she found a listing for the National Academy of Songwriters (NAS), which at the time was meeting at the Hollywood Women's Club. As Linda Geleris tells it, "On the occasion of my second visit, I shared some of my M&M's with a woman sitting next to me, whose husband had just been tapped to score his first feature film. Four months later, the couple called me up and said that a song was needed for the opening scene. The next day, I 'auditioned' my song in the couples' apartment for the  director, producer and music supervisor. It could not have fit the opening  scene any better, and the next day the as-yet unrecorded song was recorded and immediately placed into the film. This scenario taught me the importance of networking, being personable and pleasant, and sharing M&M's whenever possible."

Forming a songwriters network seemed like the next logical step for Geleris. In a network, a group of songwriters could:
A) Learn the importance of networking with each other
B) Meet guest speakers from many different areas of the music business.
C) Encourage one another and share tips and advice

At a music seminar, Linda had recently been introduced to a gentleman who co-founded TAXI, an independent A&R service company. She called him up and pitched her idea for hosting a network with music industry guest speakers, song critiques, and occasional open mics. During the spring and summer of 1999, the ideas evolved and the periodic conversations eventually led to a commitment from Michael Lederer and TAXI to sponsor the endeavor. The first meetings were held at Beantown, a coffee shop in Sierra Madre, California. Pete Luboff was one of the first speakers.

In April 2001, Thomas "Tommy" Honles and Jimi Yamagishi, who had been members since the beginning, joined Linda Geleris as partners to handle the rapid growth of the network. Geleris, Honles, and Yamagishi created a leadership core to expand the range of opportunities available, secure a presence in cyberspace, and to search for new avenues of support for SongNet members.

Current activity 
Enlisting the help of promoter Bob Stane, SongNet has found a home at the Coffee Gallery Backstage in Altadena, California. Stane has a legacy in the live entertainment business, most notably, his involvement in establishing The Ice House comedy club in Pasadena, California. In its Altadena location, SongNet meets a short 20-minute drive away from Hollywood and provides a unique meeting venue for the singer-songwriting community that lives east of the area, in Pasadena, in the San Gabriel Valley and further east.

Geleris and Yamagishi have extensive contacts in the singer-songwriter community, and Honles has been the webmaster for the organization since 2001. In addition to the partners, volunteers from the singer-songwriter community and the SongNet membership have acted as singer-songwriter showcase coordinators, special event staff, and goodwill spokespersons. In April 2008, the organization has revised its name to reflect its greater involvement in areas outside Los Angeles city proper, adopting simply "The Songwriters Network" instead of the Los Angeles Songwriter's Network.

Membership in the organization exists in two levels, a free "basic" membership, and a paid membership that supports the SongNet organization financially, and provides the paying member a link on the organization's website, plus a discount at certain other organization's events.

References

  About Us, The Songwriters Network (SongNet)
  Songwriter's Market, Ian Bessler, editor,

External links 
 
 [ Allmusic Page]

Music organizations based in the United States